Gerd Friedrich Bollmann (September 28, 1947 in Wanne-Eickel, Herne, North Rhine-Westphalia – September 17, 2017) was a German politician. A member of the SPD, Bollman served in the Bundestag from 2002 to 2013, representing the electoral district of Herne – Bochum II.

He died on September 17, 2017, at the age of 69.

References

External links 
Website from Gerd Friedrich Bollmann
 Biography by German Bundestag

1947 births
2017 deaths
People from Herne, North Rhine-Westphalia
German Protestants
Members of the Bundestag for North Rhine-Westphalia
Members of the Bundestag 2009–2013
Members of the Bundestag 2005–2009
Members of the Bundestag 2002–2005
Members of the Bundestag for the Social Democratic Party of Germany